The British Acupuncture Council (BAcC) is a self-regulatory body for the practice of traditional acupuncture in the UK.

About 
With around 3,000 members the British Acupuncture Council (BAcC) is the UK's largest self-regulatory body for practitioners of traditional acupuncture. The BAcC's aim is to ensure health and safety of the public at all times. In February 2013 the organisation became one of the first to appear on the Accredited Voluntary Register run by the Professional Standards Authority for Health and Social Care. For more information about the regulation of acupuncture in the UK and worldwide, see the article Regulation of acupuncture.

History 
The BAcC was formed in June 1995 by the unification of five member acupuncture groups of its precursor body, the Council For Acupuncture (CFA 1980-1995).

The five original groups were:
 The Chung San Acupuncture Society
 The British Acupuncture Association
 The Register of Traditional Chinese Medicine
 The International Register of Oriental Medicine
 The Traditional Acupuncture Society.

It was unanimously agreed by the CFA members that one body should represent and govern professionally qualified traditional acupuncturists in all aspects of their work. Since its inception the BAcC has sought to act as a voluntary self-regulator of its members.

The British Acupuncture Association and Register was founded in 1961 with the other four groups being founded between 1984 and 1986. The total membership number at the BAcC's inception in 1995 was approximately 1500 growing to 1757 by 1996,the first year of its existence.

References
Listing on Professional Standards Authority Accredited Voluntary Register

External links 
The British Acupuncture Council Website - www.acupuncture.org.uk

Acupuncture organizations
London Borough of Hammersmith and Fulham
Medical regulation in the United Kingdom
Organizations established in 1995
1995 establishments in the United Kingdom